Platanthera stenochila is a species of flowering plant in the family Orchidaceae, native from east Nepal through the eastern Himalayas of India to south-central China (north-west Yunnan).

Taxonomy
The species was first described in 1896, as Herminium angustilabre. It was later placed in either the genus Monorchis or the genus Androcorys, both now included in Herminium. A molecular phylogenetic study in 2014 found that it was deeply embedded in a clade of Platanthera species, and so transferred it to that genus as Platanthera angustilabris (King & Pantl.) X.H.Jin, Schuit. & W.T.Jin. However, this name had already been used for a different species, Platanthera angustilabris Seidenf., so was an illegitimate name. In 2015, an acceptable replacement name, Platanthera stenochila, was published.

References

stenochila
Flora of Yunnan
Flora of East Himalaya
Flora of Nepal
Plants described in 1896